Violent Shit is a 1989 West German horror film written and directed by Andreas Schnaas.

Plot 
A young boy named Karl Berger (a surname given in the sequel) murders his abusive mother with a meat cleaver after she beats him for returning home late. Twenty years later, in the mid-1970s, the imprisoned Karl is being transported to an unspecified location by the police, but manages to kill his captors and escape into the wilderness, somehow acquiring a cleaver in the process. Over the course of several days, Karl commits a series of murders across the countryside, mutilating and occasionally cannibalizing his victims. After one double homicide, Karl faints and flashes back to the day he murdered his mother, revealing he had been coerced into killing her by a demon (which a line of dialogue indicates might be his father) he had encountered in the cellar after being locked in it.

At one point, Karl also encounters an apparition of Jesus crucified in the forest, which he hacks open, and crawls inside. After this encounter, Karl commits an additional dual murder outside a church then collapses in a field. His skin (which had been inexplicably decaying throughout the film) rots off, and he dies by ripping himself open, revealing a baby covered in blood.

Cast 
 Karl Inger as Karl Berger (as K. The Butcher Shitter)
 Gabi Bäzner
 Wolfgang Hinz as Wolfgang
 Volker Mechter
 Christian Biallas
 Uwe Boldt
 Marco Hegele
 Lars Warncke
 Werner Knifke
 Andreas Schnaas as Landscaper #2
 Steve Aquilina
 Bettina X.
 Maren Y.
 Beate Z.

Reception 

Violent Shit received mostly negative reviews from critics upon its release.
HorrorNews.net criticized the film's thin plot, amateurish sound and camerawork, but commended the film's gore sequences, and for its creativity on such a small budget; writing, "If you want your horror films to have some substance, then you might want to look elsewhere, but otherwise you will be well-served". Reviewing the DVD release for the Violent Shit Collection, Nathaniel Thompson from Mondo Digital called the film "a nearly plotless VHS wonder", criticizing the film's technical ineptitude, and unconvincing gore effects.
Brett Gallman from Oh, the Horror! praised the film's raw violence, stating, "However crude the rest of this amateur production may be, there’s no denying the power of this gore-soaked mayhem. Both Schnaas’s willingness to push boundaries and his attention to squeamish detail are noteworthy... forcing the audience to either confront it head on or look away in disgust." Gallman concluded his review by writing, "Underestimate and judge the surface of Violent Shit at your own risk because this is the stuff of pure, uncut nightmare fuel."

Legacy

Remake
A name-only remake entitled Violent Shit: The Movie, was released in 2015. A German and Italian co-production, it was written and directed by Luigi Pastore, and co-written by Lucio Massa and Emanuele Barbera. The original's director, Andreas Schnaas, was not involved in any way.

References

External links 
 

1989 films
German slasher films
Camcorder films
Demons in film
German splatter films
1989 horror films
Body horror films
West German films
Films about orphans
Films set in forests
Films set in West Germany
Films shot in Germany
Films shot in Hamburg
1980s German-language films
Films about cannibalism
Mass murder in fiction
Religious horror films
Films about child abuse
German independent films
German nonlinear narrative films
1980s supernatural horror films
1989 direct-to-video films
Direct-to-video horror films
Films directed by Andreas Schnaas
Films about dysfunctional families
Films set in the 1970s
German avant-garde and experimental films
1980s avant-garde and experimental films
1989 directorial debut films
1980s slasher films
German serial killer films
1980s exploitation films
1980s German films